NA-180 Muzaffargarh-VI is a constituency for the National Assembly of Pakistan.

Election 2002 

General elections were held on 10 Oct 2002. Abdul Qayyum Khan Jatoi of PPP won by 69,653 votes.

Election 2008 

General elections were held on 18 Feb 2008. Abdul Qayyum Khan Jatoi of PPP won by 68,270 votes.

Election 2013 

General elections were held on 11 May 2013. Sardar Aashiq Khan Gopang of Independent won by 71480 votes and became the  member of National Assembly.

Election 2018 

General elections were held on 25 July 2018. Pakistan Tehreek-e-Insaf candidate Amir Talal Gopang elected member national assembly from NA-186 Muzaffargarh-VI

See also
NA-179 Muzaffargarh-III
NA-181 Layyah-I

References 
Muhammad Dawood Khan Vote Count.

External links 
Election result's official website

NA-180

Constituencies of Muzaffargarh
Politics of Muzaffargarh
Constituencies of Pakistan